Antah railway station is a railway station in Baran district, Rajasthan. Its code is ATH. It serves Antah city. The station consists of two platforms. Passenger, Express, and Superfast trains halt here.

References

Railway stations in Baran district
Kota railway division